This is a list of episodes of the American television series Tosh.0.

Series overview

Episodes

Season 1 (2009)

Season 2 (2010)

Season 3 (2011)

Season 4 (2012)

Season 5 (2013)

Season 6 (2014)

Season 7 (2015)

Season 8 (2016)

Season 9 (2017)

Season 10 (2018)

Season 11 (2019)

Season 12 (2020)

References

External links

Tosh.0 Episode Guide from epguides.com
Tosh.0 episodes from cc.com

Lists of reality television series episodes
Lists of American comedy television series episodes